Janet Marjorie Davidson  (born 1941) is a New Zealand archaeologist who has carried out extensive field work in the Pacific Islands throughout Polynesia, Micronesia and Melanesia.

Career
Davidson carried out field work in the Society Islands at Moorea (1961–1962), Samoa (1964, 1965–1966), Tonga (1964) and Nukuoro (1965) in the Federated States of Micronesia as well as Papua New Guinea and the Solomon Islands.

In 1964, Davidson graduated with a Master of Arts degree in anthropology from the University of Auckland. In 1965, she was the E. Earle Vaile archaeologist at the Auckland Institute and Museum, a position she held until 1980 when she moved to Dunedin, and was appointed an honorary research associate in archaeology by the Auckland War Memorial Museum. She was an honorary lecturer at the University of Otago and later held the position of senior curator, Pacific, at the Museum of New Zealand Te Papa Tongarewa.

Davidson and Green carried out archaeological field work in Samoa in the 1960s. They co-authored Archaeology in Western Samoa and laid the foundation for archaeology in Samoa. Part of Davidson's field work was studying settlement patterns in Samoa before 1840.

Davidson has published widely on the prehistory of New Zealand and the Pacific Islands. She edited the New Zealand Journal of Archaeology from 1985 to 2008. She was also a major contributor to the Journal of the Polynesian Society.

Honours
In the 1996 Queen's Birthday Honours, Davidson was appointed an Officer of the New Zealand Order of Merit, for services to archaeology.

In 2007, the archaeology publication Vastly Ingenious was published in her honour. Titled Vastly Ingenious:The Archaeology of Pacific Material Culture - in honour of Janet M. Davidson, the book presented essays of new research by leading international scholars with an introduction by Davidson's colleague Roger Curtis Green. Published by Otago University Press, the book was edited by three Pacific prehistorians: Atholl Anderson, Kaye C. Green, and Foss Leach.
Janet’s career combined active and often pioneering fieldwork across the Pacific with an imaginative approach to museum research and display that attracted young scholars, explains contributor Roger Green; she kept material culture in the public eye.In 2017, Davidson was selected as one of the Royal Society Te Apārangi's "150 women in 150 words", celebrating the contributions of women to knowledge in New Zealand.

See also
 Archaeology in Samoa

References

1941 births
Living people
Historians of the Pacific
Historians of Polynesia
New Zealand women historians
New Zealand archaeologists
University of Auckland alumni
New Zealand women archaeologists
Officers of the New Zealand Order of Merit
20th-century archaeologists
21st-century archaeologists
21st-century New Zealand women writers
20th-century New Zealand women writers
20th-century New Zealand historians
21st-century New Zealand historians
People associated with the Auckland War Memorial Museum